Souleymane Cissé (born 8 August 2002) is a French professional footballer who plays as a centre-back for  club Clermont.

Professional career
A youth product of Lens, Cissé began his senior career with their reserves in 2020. He transferred to Clermont on 22 June 2022, signing a 1+2 years professional contract. On 20 January 2021, he made his senior and professional debut with the senior Clermont side as a late substitute in a 1–0 Ligue 1 loss to Marseille on 31 August 2022.

Personal life
Born in France, Cissé is of Senegalese descent.

References

External links
 
 
 
 
 

2002 births
Living people
French footballers
French sportspeople of Senegalese descent
Association football defenders
RC Lens players
Clermont Foot players
Ligue 1 players
Championnat National players
Championnat National 3 players